The Ezra Abbott House is a historic house in Owatonna, Minnesota, United States.  It was built around 1860 for Ezra Abbott (1805–1876), an influential early settler of Owatonna.  The house was listed on the National Register of Historic Places in 1975 for having local significance in the theme of exploration/settlement.  It was nominated for its associations with Abbott, who settled in Owatonna in 1855, helped survey the townsite, built the sawmill that produced much of the town's lumber, served as Steele County's first superintendent of schools, and helped advocate for the creation of the Minneapolis and Cedar Valley Railroad.

See also
 National Register of Historic Places listings in Steele County, Minnesota

References

External links
 

1860 establishments in Minnesota
Greek Revival houses in Minnesota
Houses completed in 1860
Houses in Steele County, Minnesota
Houses on the National Register of Historic Places in Minnesota
National Register of Historic Places in Steele County, Minnesota